William Nielsen Brandt (born June 10, 1970; also known as Niel Brandt) is the Verne M. Willaman Professor of Astronomy & Astrophysics and a professor of physics at the Pennsylvania State University. He is best known for his work on active galaxies, cosmological X-ray surveys, starburst galaxies, normal galaxies, and X-ray binaries.

Education 
Brandt was born in Durham, North Carolina, but mostly grew up in Janesville, Wisconsin. He attended Milton High School in Milton, Wisconsin, and Phillips Exeter Academy in Exeter, New Hampshire. His undergraduate studies were done at the California Institute of Technology (B.S. 1992), where he lived in Blacker Hovse (sharing a room with Ian Agol) and was awarded the George Green Prize for Creative Scholarship. His graduate studies were done at the Institute of Astronomy, Cambridge with Andrew Fabian.

Career 
From 1996 to 1997 Brandt held a postdoctoral fellowship at the Center for Astrophysics  Harvard & Smithsonian where he worked with colleagues including Martin Elvis and Belinda Wilkes. In 1997, he took up an assistant professor appointment at the Pennsylvania State University. He was promoted to associate professor in 2001, full professor in 2003, Distinguished Professor in 2010, and Verne M. Willaman Professor in 2014.

Research and teaching 
Brandt's research focuses on observational studies of supermassive black holes (SMBHs) and cosmological X-ray surveys. Specific 
objects investigated include actively accreting SMBHs (i.e., active galactic nuclei: AGNs), starburst galaxies, and 
normal galaxies. His work utilizes data from facilities at the forefront of astrophysical discovery, including the 
Chandra X-ray Observatory, XMM-Newton, NuSTAR, and the Sloan Digital Sky Survey. He is also involved with 
upcoming projects including the Large Synoptic Survey Telescope, the Advanced Telescope for High Energy Astrophysics (ATHENA), 
and new X-ray missions. In his cosmological X-ray surveys work, Brandt has been a leader in obtaining the most-sensitive X-ray 
surveys to date, including the Chandra Deep Field-North and the Chandra Deep Field-South. These have been used to 
explore the demography, physics, and ecology of typical growing SMBHs over most of cosmic history. They have also 
allowed the study of X-ray source populations in starburst and normal galaxies out to cosmological distances. 
In his general AGN studies, he has investigated AGN winds, the X-ray properties of the first quasars, and extreme AGN populations
(e.g., Narrow-Line Seyfert 1 galaxies and weak-line quasars). He has also worked on investigations of the cosmic microwave background radiation and the effects of neutron-star and black-hole natal kicks. Brandt is an author of more than 500 research papers on these subjects.

Brandt leads a small research group including postdoctoral researchers, graduate students, and undergraduate students. 
Many of them, after developing their skills via their research projects, have gone on to win professorial and permanent staff 
positions as well as distinguished fellowships and scholarships, becoming new leaders around the world in astrophysics.
Brandt also regularly teaches courses on high-energy astrophysics, black holes, and active galaxies.

Selected awards 
 Caltech George Green Prize for Creative Scholarship, 1992
 NSF Graduate Research Fellowship, 1994–1996
 Sloan Fellowship, 1999–2004
 NSF Faculty Early Career Development (CAREER) Award, 2000–2005
 Newton Lacy Pierce Prize in Astronomy, 2004
 Fellow of the American Physical Society, 2009
 Bruno Rossi Prize, 2016
 Elected a Legacy Fellow of the American Astronomical Society, 2020

References

External links 
Personal WWW page at the Pennsylvania State University
Newton Lacy Pierce Prize
Bruno Rossi Prize

1970 births
Living people
20th-century  American astronomers
21st-century  American astronomers
People from Janesville, Wisconsin
Phillips Exeter Academy alumni
California Institute of Technology alumni
Harvard University staff
Pennsylvania State University faculty
Fellows of the American Astronomical Society